Rags to riches refers to any situation in which a person rises from poverty to wealth, and in some cases from absolute obscurity to heights of fame, fortune and celebrity—sometimes instantly. This is a common archetype in literature and popular culture, such as the writings of Horatio Alger, Jr.

Pre-20th-century fictional examples
 Fairy tales, such as Cinderella and Aladdin.
 The Dickens novel Oliver Twist, whose protagonist rises from a workhouse to child labour to a gang of pickpockets to being adopted by a wealthy family.
 The Arthurian story of Sir Gareth, who rises from a lowly kitchen boy to a prominent Knight of the Round Table.
 The folklore tale of Dick Whittington and His Cat, who, with the help of his cat, rises from orphaned poverty to become thrice Lord Mayor of London.

Historical examples

 Abdalonymus was a gardener who was appointed king of Sidon by Alexander the Great due to his possible royal ancestry.
 Baibars, a slave who rose to become the Mamluk Sultan of Egypt through his military prowess.
 Emperor Basil I, born a simple peasant in the theme of Macedonia, he rose in the Imperial court and despite his humble origins, he showed great ability in running the affairs of state. On Michael III's death, Basil, as an already acclaimed co-emperor, automatically became the ruling emperor.
 Catherine I of Russia, born into a peasant family, married Peter the Great, and became Empress of Russia following his death.
 Chandragupta Maurya of India, who from a humble beginning founded the Maurya Empire.
 Emperor Diocletian, born to a freed slave of low social standing in Dalmatia, rose through the ranks of the Roman military to become a cavalry commander. After the death of emperor Carus, Diocletian defeated the former emperor's son Carinus in battle and proclaimed himself Roman emperor. His reign was marked by the consolidation of power around himself and its impact on the history of the late Roman Empire. He eventually gave up his post in later life to become a farmer.
 Emperor Gaozu of Han and Hongwu Emperor who were both born into peasant families, but eventually founded two of the nation's most illustrious imperial dynasties.
 Fredegund, a palace servant who rose to become the Regent Queen of Neustria, in the western part of the Kingdom of the Franks.
 George Thomas (soldier), born into a poor Irish farming family, became a mercenary in India eventually rising to become a wealthy Raja.
 Genghis Khan was born the son of a Mongol chieftain, but following his father's death, he and his family were abandoned by their clan and left in poverty on the Mongolian steppe. He survived and went on to create the largest land empire in history.
 Giovanni di Bicci de' Medici, born in poverty, founded the Medici bank; the Medici were a common family.
 Pope Gregory VII was born a commoner Hildebrand, perhaps the son of a blacksmith. His bad reputation was partially due to horror at his high social mobility.
 Emperor Guangwu of Han lived life as a peasant at one point in his life despite being a distant royal. He eventually restored the Han dynasty.
 Hurrem Sultan, also known as Roxelana, was the chief consort and legal wife of the Ottoman Sultan Suleiman the Magnificent. She became one of the most powerful and influential women in Ottoman history and a prominent and controversial figure during the era known as the Sultanate of Women.
 Ivaylo of Bulgaria was a peasant farmer who briefly ruled over Bulgaria after organizing an uprising against the incompetent rule of Constantine Tikh.
 Emperors Justin I, Justinian the Great and Theodora came from peasant families. Justin and Justinian later became Emperors of the Eastern Roman Empire. Theodora was a courtesan and actress. Later became Empress and second in the Empire.
 Karin Månsdotter, daughter of a soldier and jailkeeper named Måns, became Queen of Sweden by her marriage with King Eric XIV of Sweden.
 Pope Leo III was of commoner origin and attained a high position in spite of violent opposition from the nobility, who considered the papacy as their preserve.
 Leonora Dori, a French courtier of Italian origin and an influential favourite of the French regent Marie de' Medici, mother of King Louis XIII of France.
 Abraham Lincoln, born into poverty in a log cabin and raised on the American frontier, he was mostly self-educated and rose to become a lawyer, then congressman, and finally President of the United States, where he led the Union through the American Civil War, defended the ideals of democracy and liberty, abolished slavery, strengthened the federal government, and modernized the U.S. economy.
 Madame de Maintenon, second wife of King Louis XIV of France and founder of the Maison royale de Saint-Louis, a school for girls from poorer noble families.
 Mahmud of Ghazni, son of a Turkic slave, who founded the Ghaznavid Empire.
 Emperor Michael II hailed from a family of peasants who were granted land via military service to the Roman Empire. He eventually became Emperor after assassinating his former colleague Emperor Leo V.
 Nader Shah, founder of the Afsharid dynasty, was the orphaned son of a goatherder who established the most powerful empire in modern Persian history.
 Shō En was a peasant farmer who became king of the Ryukyu Kingdom and founder of the Second Shō dynasty.
 Pope Sixtus IV, Pope from 9 August 1471 to his death in 1484, founder of the Della Rovere family.
 Toyotomi Hideyoshi, a famous example in late medieval times, helped unify pre-modern Japan.
 Wei Zhongxian of Ming Dynasty China, a gambler who castrated himself and entered the Imperial Palace where he ended enormous power under the reign of the Tianqi Emperor. He eventually committed suicide upon banishment by the Chongzhen Emperor.
Empress Xiaowu Si of Han, or Wei Zifu, was born in a peasant family and ended up as the second wife and empress of Emperor Wu of Han
 Emperor Xuan of Han brought up a commoner despite royal blood, later rose to become a capable ruler.

Pre-modern and modern times 

Thousands of people have risen from poverty to riches; some are: 
Pryce Pryce-Jones - left school at 12 and formed the first mail order company in 1861, with the BBC calling it an extraordinary rags to riches story.
Michael Schumacher - Was born and raised as bricklayer's son but went on to become a 7 times F1 world champion and holds the record for the most F1 world titles won by any F1 driver.
Bette Midler - Was born and raised in Hawaii by her mother Ruth and her father Fred, a house painter  
Jim Rohn - (author and motivational speaker).        
Cardi B - Was born in Manhattan. Lived mostly with her grandmother. Joined the Bloods at 16 and became a stripper at 19. Went on to become one of the most successful female rappers in the world and has the most number-one singles on the Billboard Hot 100 among female rappers (5 number-ones).
Giannis Antetokounmpo - Born in Athens, Greece to parents from Nigeria. As a child growing up in the Sepolia neighborhood of Athens, his father had a tough time finding work, so he helped his family by hawking watches, handbags, and sunglasses in the streets. He started playing basketball in 2007 and joined EFAO Zografou B.C. in the Greek B Basket League. After racking up several impressive individual accolades, he was selected 15th overall by the Milwaukee Bucks in the 2013 NBA Draft. In his first season in the NBA, he was named to the NBA All-Rookie Team. Since then, he has earned several honors, including being named to the NBA All-Star game five times, and winning the league MVP award twice. In 2021, he led the Bucks to their first NBA Championship in 50 years, scoring 50 points in the clinching game. He also was named NBA Finals MVP. 
Cher - Was born in California to a truck driver with gambling problems and a mother who was an occasional model. Her parents divorced when she was 10 months old. She went on to become the "goddess of pop."
Cuauhtémoc Blanco - born in Mexico City, in the district of Tlatilco, but grew up in Tepito, one of the most poor sectors of the Mexican capital.  He grew up in poverty, raised by his single mother who eventually re-married. Blanco came to be one of the greatest Mexican footballers of all time, as well as one of the best penalty takers of all time. After football, Blanco became a politician and he is the current Governor of Morelos under the coalition Juntos Haremos Historia.
Bas & Aad van Toor - Born shortly before and during World War II, the Van Toor brothers came from a poor labourers family in the Netherlands. Their home was damaged during the German bombing of Rotterdam and the brothers' father died in Prague from harsh conditions during forced labour. After the war, the brothers and their mother lived in extreme poverty. After working an odd number of jobs, the brothers created their own acrobat act, with which they toured all over the world. Between 1976 and 1994, the brothers wrote, directed and shot a successful children's television series based on their alter egos Bassie & Adriaan and owned their own circus, which turned them into multi-millionaires. They are praised for their self-made success and rigid management techniques.
Susan Boyle - Prior to her audition on Britain's Got Talent, Boyle was a single, never married woman living alone with her pet cat, Pebbles. She cared for her elderly mother, Bridget, until her death in 2007 at the age of 91. Boyle was a member of her local church choir and performed regularly at church events and local talent shows. When she appeared on the BGT stage, Boyle was met with skepticism and cynicism, with many in the audience jeering or rolling their eyes. When she began to sing, Boyle shocked everyone with her powerhouse voice. Judge Piers Morgan said it was "the biggest surprise I have had in three years in this show". Amanda Holden summed up her critique by calling it the "biggest wake-up call ever". Show creator/producer Simon Cowell called Boyle "a little tiger". Despite an overwhelming positive response from the public, dance troupe Diversity were named the winners of series 3, making Boyle runner-up. Boyle went on to worldwide acclaim and success.
Conor McGregor – Was living on Ireland's social welfare before his UFC debut.
Floyd Mayweather Jr. - His mother was a heroin addict and his father was a boxer who was eventually incarcerated. His family was poor and sometimes did not even have electricity. For much of his childhood, he was raised by his grandmother. Eventually, he became one of the highest-rated boxers of all time and is known for his extravagant spending habits.
Axl Rose - Born in Lafayette, Indiana to a poor and very religious family, as a child he sang in a trio with his brother and sister. Being very shy at school, following the discovery of his true family origins, Rose became the local juvenile delinquent in Lafayette; he was arrested more than 20 times on charges such as public intoxication and battery, and served jail terms up to three months. After Lafayette authorities threatened to charge him as a habitual criminal, Rose moved to Los Angeles, California, in December 1982 following his school friend Izzy Stradlin; they used to live together in very cheap and dirty rooms around LA before signing with Geffen Records in 1986.
Roman Abramovich
Alexis Sánchez 
Joan Crawford came from a damaged, impoverished, single-mother family and was partly raised in a laundry. She also had to undertake a work scholarship to receive an education as a child. 
Sheldon Adelson
Dhirubhai Ambani
AJ Styles
Charles Bronson was born from a poor coal-mining family of Lithuanian descent; he began working at the coal mines from the age of 10 after his father's death; his family was so poor that, at one time, he had to wear his sister's dress to school for lack of clothing. Grew up to become one of the greatest film actors during the Golden Age of Hollywood.
Ursula Burns – Raised by her Panamanian-immigrant single mother in the Baruch Houses, a New York City public housing project. She became the CEO (July 2009 – December 2016) and Chairwoman (May 2010 – present) of Xerox, a Fortune 500 company.
Andrew Carnegie (Industrialist) 
Jim Carrey 
Ben Carson
Jason Kay – Before he became the lead singer of Jamiroquai, Kay had lived on the streets as a teenager and was even stabbed. Jamiroquai went on to be one of the most successful bands of all time, selling 26 million albums during Kay's career.
Sean Connery – Worked as a milkman before joining the Royal Navy but was later discharged due to a duodenal ulcer.  Afterwards, he worked as, among other things, a lorry driver, a lifeguard, a labourer, an artist's model for the Edinburgh College of Art, and a coffin polisher. He began his acting career while working backstage at the King's Theatre where he had secured several minor roles, but was still struggling to make ends meet. He was then forced to accept a part-time job as a babysitter. Connery's breakthrough came in the role of British secret agent James Bond, which began his successful acting career. In July 2000, he was knighted by Queen Elizabeth II.
Coco Chanel
Charlie Chaplin
Chow Yun-fat – Born and raised in a farming community on Lamma Island, Hong Kong. His family's house had no electricity. During mornings, he helped his mother sell herbal jelly and Hakka tea-pudding on the streets; during afternoons he worked in the fields. At age seventeen, he left school to help support the family by doing odd jobs including hotel porter, postman, camera salesman, and taxi driver. Eventually, he became one of the most well-known and highest-earning actors in Hong Kong.
Kurt Cobain
Eminem – Grew up in a working-class neighborhood in Detroit. He dropped out of high school at age 17 and worked at several jobs to help his mother pay the bills, but she often threw him out of the house. He eventually had a successful rap career, becoming one of the world's best-selling music artists.
Chris Gardner – Lived in foster care with his sisters after their mother was imprisoned. Worked as a research lab assistant after serving in the U.S. Navy. He also became a medical equipment salesman. He gained a position in Dean Witter Reynolds' stock brokerage training program but did not have a salary. For a time, Gardner and his son were homeless. They ate in soup kitchens and slept in his office after hours, at flophouses, motels, parks, airports, on public transport, and at the Glide Memorial United Methodist Church's shelter for homeless women. He eventually established Gardner Rich & Co. Gardner's memoirs, The Pursuit of Happyness, was published in May 2006. The 2006 film The Pursuit of Happyness, starring Will Smith, is based on his memoirs.
John Gokongwei – He was 13 years old when his father died. He supported his family by peddling items along the streets of Cebu on his bicycle. From the age of 17 to 19, he traded using a wooden boat, shipping items to Lucena by sea, and then to Manila by truck. He is now one of the richest Filipinos. His business assets include: Universal Robina, Cebu Pacific, JG Summit Holdings, and Robinsons Malls.
Jimi Hendrix
Zlatan Ibrahimović – Grew up in Rosengård, a poor suburb of Malmö. He eventually became one of the highest-paid football players in the world. He is the all-time leading goalscorer for Sweden.
Mahalia Jackson
Michael Jackson – Grew up into a working-class family in Gary, Indiana in a two bedroom house with nine siblings and his parents. His mother was a stay-at-home mom who had dreams of being an aspiring country singer who played the piano and the clarinet, while his father, a crane operator for Inland Steel Company had hopes of making it big through boxing or singing with his band The Falcons. He started to play with The Jackson 5 in 1964 when he was five years old and then became one of the biggest stars of the planet.
LeBron James – Born to a 16-year-old single mother, his childhood was spent moving from apartment to apartment in the sordid neighborhoods of Akron, Ohio while his mother struggled to find a steady job. He grew up to have a successful career in the NBA, with four championships (2012, 2013, 2016, 2020). He is the Cleveland Cavaliers' all-time leading scorer. He also won two Olympic gold medals for the United States National Basketball Team. He is currently one of the world's highest-paid athletes.
Jewel –  Grew up in a house that lacked indoor plumbing and had only a simple outhouse. Early in her music career, she lived in her car while traveling around the United States doing street performances and small gigs. 
Li Ka-Shing (businessman) 
Jan Koum (technology entrepreneur)
Ralph Lauren (fashion designer)
Stan Lee – His father was a dress cutter who worked only sporadically after the Great Depression. By the time Lee was in his teens, the family was living in a third-floor one-bedroom apartment where he shared the bedroom with his brother while his parents slept on a foldout couch. In his youth, he worked part-time jobs such as writing obituaries and press releases, delivering sandwiches,  running office errands, ushering at a theater, and selling newspaper subscriptions. He went on to create Spider-Man, the Hulk, Doctor Strange, the Fantastic Four, Iron Man, Daredevil, Thor, the X-Men, and many other fictional characters. 
David Letterman
Martin W. Littleton (lawyer)
Jack London - At age 14, he was working 12 to 18 hours a day in a cannery. He was also an oyster pirate, seal hunter, jute mill worker, and coal heaver before becoming a vagrant. At the age of 21, due to financial circumstances, he dropped out from UC Berkeley and joined the Klondike Gold Rush. He eventually had a successful writing career; his most famous works are The Call of the Wild and White Fang.
Diego Maradona - Grew up in a shantytown on the outskirts of Buenos Aires. He went on to lead Argentina to victory in the 1986 FIFA World Cup where he also won the Golden Ball as the tournament's best player. He is also the first player in football history to set the world record transfer fee twice, first when he transferred to FC Barcelona for a then world record £5 million, and second, when he transferred to S.S.C. Napoli for another record fee £6.9 million. He was named the FIFA Co-Player of the 20th Century, an honor he shares with Pelé.
George R. R. Martin – Early in his writing career, he "wasn't making enough money to stay alive". He went on to write the international bestselling series of epic fantasy novels, A Song of Ice and Fire, which was later adapted into the HBO television series Game of Thrones.
Isko Moreno – Born and raised in the slums of Tondo, Manila, Philippines to a stevedore father and laundrywoman mother. Moreno spent most of his childhood finding alternative sources of income for his family by working as a scrap and garbage collector, and driving a passenger pedicab. He also used to rummage through restaurant garbage bins for leftover food (colloquially called pagpag in the Philippines), which his mother would recook for dinner. Moreno rose to prominence when he was discovered by a talent scout while attending a funeral and was then persuaded to join show business. He achieved average success as an actor for five years before entering politics. He was subsequently elected as councilor, vice mayor and mayor in the City of Manila, the Philippines' capital country, which elevated him to further prominence. Moreno has since received several awards in his political career.
Jim Morrison
Liz Murray (motivational speaker)
Benito Mussolini 
Trevor Noah - Born in Apartheid-era South Africa to a Black Xhosa mother and a White father from Switzerland. He had a poor upbringing in Soweto, just outside of Johannesburg. His challenges included not having indoor plumbing in his childhood home, separation from his biological father due to Apartheid, and having an abusive, alcoholic step-father. At the age of 18, he landed a starring role on the South African soap opera Isidingo. He later became an accomplished stand-up comedian, releasing numerous specials. In the fall of 2015, he took over for Jon Stewart and became the host of The Daily Show, a position he held until 2022. 
Manny Pacquiao – Dropped out of high school and left home at age 14 due to extreme poverty. For a time, he lived on the streets of Manila. He eventually became the first and only eight-division world champion in professional boxing and one of the highest-paid athletes in the world.
Sarah Jessica Parker (actress) 
Arnel Pineda – His mother suffered from heart disease and died when he was 13 years old, leaving their family in debt. Pineda then quit school and started working. He spent about two years on the streets, collecting glass bottles, newspapers, and scrap metal and selling them to recyclers. He also took odd jobs like cleaning scrap metal and docked ships. He didn't have much to eat, sometimes rationing a small package of Marie biscuit as food for two days. When Pineda was 15 years old, he became the lead singer of the Filipino group Ijos which began his music career. In 2007, he was recruited to become the new lead singer of the American rock band Journey.
Chris Pratt – Dropped out of community college halfway through the first semester and, after working as a discount ticket salesman and daytime stripper, he ended up homeless in Maui, Hawaii, sleeping in a van and a tent on the beach. He was working at the Bubba Gump Shrimp Company restaurant in Maui when he was offered his first film role which then led to a successful film career.
 Jim Jones - He grew up with neglectful parents in a shack that lacked plumbing and electricity. His family often depended on the financial support of relatives. In 1954 he founded his own church and by the mid-1970s he had amassed a large fortune and had established an international community.
Elvis Presley - Elvis was born in Mississippi and moved to Memphis. His family was so poor that his dad was arrested for a bad $4 check. At age 19, he became   a mega star with his recording of 'That's All Right'. He went on to sell over 250 million albums, with 19 no. 1 hits and 115 top 40 hits. He won three Grammies and starred in 31 movies.
Dennis Rodman – His father left the family when he was young, forcing his mother to work odd jobs (up to four at the same time) to support them. Rodman grew up in Oak Cliff, one of the most impoverished areas of Dallas at the time. After high school, he worked as a janitor at Dallas Fort Worth International Airport. He eventually had a successful career in the NBA, with five championships (1989, 1990, 1996, 1997, 1998). He also led the NBA in rebounds per game for seven consecutive years (1991–1998). In 2011, he was inducted to the Basketball Hall of Fame.
Cristiano Ronaldo – His mother was a cook while his father was a gardener. He grew up in poverty and shared a room with his three elder siblings. He subsequently became one of the world's best-paid and most famous athletes. He is the all-time leading goalscorer for both Real Madrid and Portugal.
J. K. Rowling – Was an unemployed single mother living on welfare benefits. She described her economic status as being "poor as it is possible to be in modern Britain, without being homeless." She found success after writing the Harry Potter novels, which have gained worldwide attention, won multiple awards, and sold more than 400 million copies. She is the United Kingdom's best-selling living author and one of the richest people in the country.
Colonel Sanders – When he was 10, he began to work as a farmhand. He also worked as a horse carriage painter, streetcar conductor, teamster for the United States Army, blacksmith's helper, steam engine stoker, insurance & tire salesman, filling station operator, and secretary before founding KFC.
Irina Shayk – Her father was a coal miner who died when she was 14. Her mother was forced to work two jobs to provide for the family. Shayk became a successful and internationally recognized model. 
Luis Suárez – Developed his football skills on the streets of Montevideo while he worked as a street sweeper. He subsequently became one of the world's best footballers, winning numerous awards including Dutch Footballer of the Year, Premier League Golden Boot, PFA Players' Player of the Year, FWA Footballer of the Year, Copa América Best Player, and European Golden Shoe. He is the all-time record goalscorer for Uruguay. In July 2014, he moved from Liverpool F.C. to FC Barcelona for a fee of £64.98 million, making him one of the most expensive players in football history.
Alan Sugar
Henry Sy – Born to a poor family in Fujian province, China and migrated to the Philippines when he was 12 years old. His parents owned a small sari-sari store where the family slept at night. In 1958, he established a small shoe store in Manila which became the first of his SM Supermalls. He eventually became one of the richest people in the Philippines.
Lucio Tan – Worked as a janitor at a tobacco factory to pay for his school fees. He is now one of the richest Filipinos. His business assets include: Philippine Airlines, University of the East, Philippine National Bank, Asia Brewery, and Tanduay.
Danny Trejo (rags: former California prison inmate –riches: Actor)
Shania Twain – Her parents earned little money and food was often scarce in their household. She eventually had a successful singing career, becoming one of the best-selling music artists of all time.
John D. Rockefeller (businessman) 
Cornelius Vanderbilt – Dropped out of school at the age of 11. At the age of 16, he began his business of ferrying freight and passengers between Staten Island and Manhattan. He went on to build his wealth in the railroad and shipping industries, becoming one of the richest Americans in history.
Madam C. J. Walker – She was an African American entrepreneur, philanthropist, and political and social activist. She is recorded as the first female self-made millionaire in America in the Guinness Book of World Records.
Manny Villar – Born and raised in a tiny rented apartment in Tondo, the impoverished, densely populated, and gang-infested slum district of Manila. His father was a civil servant while his mother was a fishmonger. At age 6, he began helping his mother sell fish and shrimp to support the family; this forced him to temporarily stop schooling. He worked part-time while attending the University of the Philippines Diliman, where he earned a degree in business administration and accountancy. After resigning from his first job, he established a seafood delivery business, which eventually failed. With a capital of ₱10,000, he started a sand-and-gravel business which evolved into Camella Homes, the Philippines' largest homebuilding company. He was also a politician, serving as representative for Las Piñas (1992–2001), and as Speaker of the House during his third term in congress (1998–2000). He also served as senator (2001–2013) and Senate President (2006–2008). He was a candidate in the 2010 Philippine presidential election but lost to Benigno Aquino III. In 2014, Forbes ranked him as the 14th-wealthiest person in the Philippines, with his net worth of US$1.460 billion.
 MrBeast - School dropped out of East Carolina University to pursue a YouTube career becoming known as the "biggest philanthropist".
Natalia Vodianova (supermodel, entrepreneur, philanthropist)
Oprah Winfrey – Her mother was a former maid, and her father a former coalminer and barber. She is in possession of a sum total wealth, estimated by Forbes magazine (true on 6 December 2015) as, net-worth 3.2. billion dollars.
Ronnie Wood (English rock musician) 
Victoria Woodhull (political activist and first female candidate to the US presidency)
Sarat Chandra Chattopadhyay - He was born in a poor Brahmin family and his financial condition deteriorated until rising to literary fame.
 Dhirubhai Ambani                                          
 Charlie Soong
 Sam Walton
 Rihanna - She grew up in a three-bedroom bungalow in Bridgetown and sold clothes with her father in a stall on the street. 
 Steve Harvey - Was homeless and stayed in a 1976 Ford for three years. He became the host of Family Feud and its celebrity and African counterparts; the longtime host of Showtime at the Apollo; authored Act Like a Lady, Think Like a Man; has a radio show; and won seven Daytime Emmy Awards, two NAB Marconi Radio Awards, and fourteen NAACP Image Awards.

Use in art and media

TV and films
 Movies, such as Rocky, Trading Places, The Wolf of Wall Street, My Fair Lady, Scarface, The Pursuit of Happyness, Goodfellas, Charlie Chaplin in The Gold Rush, The Public Enemy, The Blind Side, Guru, Slumdog Millionaire, Million Dollar Arm, and Magic Beyond Words: The J.K. Rowling Story, The Founder.
 Game shows like The Price Is Right, Queen for a Day, and Who Wants to Be a Millionaire?
 Reality television shows such as American Idol, The X Factor and Joe Millionaire.
 Rags to Riches (TV series).

Music
 Songs as "Rags to Riches", from 1953, by Richard Adler and Jerry Ross, popularized by Tony Bennett or "This Could All Be Yours", from 2010, by Guster.
 Guns N' Roses' song "Paradise City" features the term in its lyrics.
 Vilayat Khan made an album with classical Indian music (Ragas) and named it "Ragas to Riches".
 Jay-Z's song "99 Problems" features the term in its lyrics.
Rod Wave’s song “Rags2Riches (song)”
Ufo361's song "Hard Work Pays Off" features the term in its lyrics.
Notorious BIG's song "Juicy"

Print
 Rags to Riches, a comic book by Four Color Comics Edition #356
 Rags to Riches, a 1981 romance novel by Joanne Kaye (Rachel Cosgrove Payes)
 The Rise of David Levinsky has been described as "the first American novel to chronicle the Jewish American immigrant experience at the end of the 19th century:" "arrived .. with four cents in my pocket" to "worth more than two million dollars."

Sport

 A term used in many team sports when a team goes from a poor finishing position one season to a strong finishing position the following season. It also refers to a player who unexpectedly performs well. For example, NFL quarterback Kurt Warner went undrafted by any team in the 1994 NFL draft, Warner signed on with the Green Bay Packers and was cut from the team. After his dismissal from the Packers, Warner stocked shelves at an Iowa grocery store. Warner later played arena football and with NFL Europe team Amsterdam Admirals. As a backup to starting St. Louis Rams quarterback Trent Green in the 1999 NFL Season, the Rams went 13-3 in the regular season earning a spot in the playoffs. Warner played an instrumental part in the team winning Super Bowl XXXIV and went on to have a long career in pro football, making two more Super Bowl appearances and being inducted into the Pro Football Hall of Fame.

Video gaming
 Video games such as Rags to Riches, a 1985 computer game released for the Commodore 64, or Grand Theft Auto: IV, wherein the character is a poor Yugoslavian-born immigrant who rises up in the criminal empire.

Criticism
The concept of "rags to riches" has been criticised by social reformers, anti-capitalists, revolutionaries, essayists and statisticians, who argue that only a handful of exceptionally capable and/or mainly lucky persons are actually able to travel the "rags to riches" road, being the great publicity given to such cases causes a natural survivorship bias illusion, which help keep the masses of the working class and the working poor in line, preventing them from agitating for an overall collective change in the direction of social equality.

Bibliography
 Peña, Manuel. "American Mythologies" Ashgate Publishing Limited, 2012. 
 Taleb, Nassim N. "Fooled by Randomness: The Hidden Role of Chance in Life and in the Markets" Random House 2001  
 Weiss, Richard. "The American Myth of Success: From Horatio Alger to Norman Vincent Peale" Basic Books, 1969.

See also 
 American Dream
 Horatio Alger
 Lottery
 New Russians
 Nouveau riche
 Novus homo
 Self-made man
 Social mobility

References

External links
Al-Fahim, Mohammed. From Rags to Riches: A Story of Abu Dhabi, I. B. Tauris, Limited 1998, London Centre for Arab Studies.

English-language idioms
Poverty
Economics in fiction

de:Sozialer Aufstieg#Vom Tellerwäscher zum Millionär